The North Shore (of Burrard Inlet) is a term commonly used to refer to several areas adjacent to Vancouver, British Columbia, Canada:

the District of West Vancouver; 
the City of North Vancouver;
the District of North Vancouver; and
the North Shore Mountains

It is renowned for its proximity to nature, varied outdoor recreation opportunities (especially mountain biking) as well as historically significant west coast modernist architecture.

Activities
Attractions include three local ski hills – Cypress Mountain, Grouse Mountain, and Mount Seymour – which feature skiing, snowboarding, snowshoeing, tubing, and tobogganing. Hiking and watersports are also popular activities in the North Shore communities. Popular hiking areas include six mountain peaks – Black, Strachan, Hollyburn, Grouse, Fromme, and Seymour Mountains – along with the Grouse Grind, Lynn Canyon Park, Quarry Rock, Norvan Falls, Dog Mountain, and Cypress Mountain. Watersports such as canoeing, kayaking, and stand-up paddleboarding are popular in Deep Cove during the summer months. West Vancouver's Whytecliff Park is a popular location for scuba diving. The Harmony Arts Festival is a ten-day arts festival taking place in West Vancouver every summer, the Coho Festival is a celebration of environment protection and nature's annual miracle of salmon returning to North Shore rivers and streams held every September in Ambleside, West Vancouver, and the Shipyards Night Market is a summer market taking place from May to September with food, locally made products, and live music. The Polygon Gallery at Lonsdale Quay is a non-collecting Canadian public art gallery with a focus on photography and media-based art.

Access
Access to these municipalities is limited by geography. Three major bodies of water (Howe Sound to the west, Burrard Inlet to the south, and Indian Arm to the east) and the rugged peaks of the Coast Mountains to the north isolate the North Shore from the rest of the Lower Mainland. Two road bridges (the Lions' Gate Bridge and Ironworkers Memorial Second Narrows Crossing) connect to the city of Vancouver and the Trans-Canada Highway. The only other road access is by way of Highway 99 from the north or the Horseshoe Bay ferry terminal from Vancouver Island and the Sunshine Coast. The SeaBus passenger ferry, part of the Lower Mainland's transit system, connects Lonsdale Quay with Vancouver in downtown Vancouver.

See also 
Mount Brunswick
The Lions (peaks)

External links 

North Shore News – community newspaper serving the North Shore
North Shore Mountain Bike Association – information on mountain trails

North Vancouver (city)
North Vancouver (district municipality)
West Vancouver